This is a list of Australian Statutory Instruments from 1902.

Acts 
 An Act To Grant And Apply Out Of The Consolidated Revenue Fund The Sum Of Three Hundred And Twenty-thousand Nine Hundred And Fifty-five Pounds To The Service Of The Year Ending The Thirtieth Day Of June One Thousand Nine Hundred And Two (no. 1, 1902)
 An Act To Grant And Apply Out Of The Consolidated Revenue Fund The Sum Of Two Hundred And Sixty-two Thousand Four Hundred And Fifteen Pounds To The Service Of The Year Ending The Thirtieth Day Of June One Thousand Nine Hundred And Two (no. 2, 1902)
 Coronation Celebration Act 1902 (no. 3, 1902)
 An Act To Grant And Apply Out Of The Consolidated Revenue Fund The Sum Of Two Hundred And Eighty-two Thousand Eight Hundred And Thirty Four Pounds To The Service Of The Year Ending The Thirtieth Day Of June One Thousand Nine Hundred And Two (no. 4, 1902)
 Commonwealth Public Service Act 1902 (no. 5, 1902)
 An Act To Grant And Apply Out Of The Consolidated Revenue Fund The Sum Of Four Hundred And Ninety-three Thousand Nine Hundred And Forty-four Pounds To The Service Of The Year Ending The Thirtieth Day Of June One Thousand Nine Hundred And Two (no. 6, 1902)
 Governor-general's Establishment Act 1902 (no. 7, 1902)
 Commonwealth Franchise Act 1902 (no. 8, 1902)
 An Act To Grant And Apply Out Of The Consolidated Revenue Fund The Sum Of Four Hundred And Forty-eight Thousand Eight Hundred And Eighty Two Pounds To The Service Of The Year Ending The Thirtieth Day Of June One Thousand Nine Hundred And Two (no. 9, 1902)
 An Act To Grant And Apply Out Of The Consolidated Revenue Fund The Sum Of Five Hundred And Eighty-seven Thousand Two Hundred And Nineteen Pounds To The Service Of The Year Ending The Thirtieth Day Of June One Thousand Nine Hundred And Three (no. 10, 1902)
 The Excise Tariff 1902 (no. 11, 1902)
 Royal Commissions Act 1902 (no. 12, 1902)
 Post And Telegraph Rates Act 1902 (no. 13, 1902)
 Customs Tariff 1902 (no. 14, 1902)
 An Act To Grant And Apply Out Of The Consolidated Revenue Fund The Sum Of One Million Three Hundred And Sixty-five Thousand Five Hundred And Ninety-seven Pounds To The Service Of The Year Ending The Thirtieth Day Of June One Thousand Nine Hundred And Three (no. 15, 1902)
 An Act To Grant And Apply Out Of The Consolidated Revenue Fund The Sum Of Fifty-two Thousand Four Hundred And Ninety-seven Pounds To The Service Of The Year Ending The Thirtieth Day Of June One Thousand Nine Hundred And Two And To Appropriate The Supplies Granted For Such Year In This Session Of Parliament (no. 16, 1902)
 Appropriation Act 1902-3 (no. 17, 1902)
 Appropriation (works And Buildings) Act 1902-3 (no. 18, 1902)
 Commonwealth Electoral Act 1902 (no. 19, 1902)
 Parliamentary Allowances Act 1902 (no. 20, 1902)
 Claims Against The Commonwealth Act 1902 (no. 21, 1902)

See also  
 List of Acts of the Parliament of Australia
 List of Statutory Instruments of Australia

External links 
 1902 Commonwealth of Australia Numbered Act http://www.austlii.edu.au/au/legis/cth/num_act/1902/
 COMLAW Historical Acts http://www.comlaw.gov.au/Browse/ByTitle/Acts/Historical
 COMLAW Select Statutory Instruments http://www.comlaw.gov.au/Browse/ByYearNumber/SelectLIsandStatRules/Asmade/0/

Lists of the Statutory Instruments of Australia
Statutory Instruments